Bingen–White Salmon is a train station in Bingen, Washington served by Amtrak. The unstaffed station is part of a larger BNSF dispatch center located one block south of Stuben Street (SR 14) in Bingen. The building is orangish-yellow in color.

Rail service through Bingen and nearby White Salmon began on December 15, 1907, when regular service began on the Portland and Seattle Railway. The station was named after both Bingen and nearby White Salmon by a court order in 1910, and formally introduced in 1930 by the Spokane, Portland and Seattle Railway. The current station was built in 1992.

Boardings and alightings

References

External links

Amtrak Stations Database

Amtrak stations in Washington (state)
Railway stations in the United States opened in 1981
Transportation buildings and structures in Klickitat County, Washington
1981 establishments in Washington (state)